In enzymology, a phosphoadenylyl-sulfate reductase (thioredoxin) is an enzyme that catalyzes the chemical reaction

adenosine 3',5'-bisphosphate + sulfite + thioredoxin disulfide  3'-phosphoadenylyl sulfate + thioredoxin

The 3 substrates of this enzyme are adenosine 3',5'-bisphosphate, sulfite, and thioredoxin disulfide, whereas its two products are 3'-phosphoadenylyl sulfate and thioredoxin.

This enzyme belongs to the family of oxidoreductases, specifically those acting on a sulfur group of donors with a disulfide as acceptor.  The systematic name of this enzyme class is adenosine 3',5'-bisphosphate,sulfite:thioredoxin-disulfide oxidoreductase (3'-phosphoadenosine-5'-phosphosulfate-forming). Other names in common use include PAPS reductase, thioredoxin-dependent, PAPS reductase, thioredoxin:adenosine 3'-phosphate 5'-phosphosulfate reductase, 3'-phosphoadenylylsulfate reductase, thioredoxin:3'-phospho-adenylylsulfate reductase, phosphoadenosine-phosphosulfate reductase, adenosine 3',5'-bisphosphate,sulfite:oxidized-thioredoxin, and oxidoreductase (3'-phosphoadenosine-5'-phosphosulfate-forming).  This enzyme participates in sulfur metabolism.

Structural studies

References

 

EC 1.8.4
Enzymes of known structure